Muraltia bolusii is a plant species in the milkwort family (Polygalaceae). It is endemic to sandy coastal flatland with altitudes below  in Western Cape, South Africa. It was first described in 1954 by Margaret Levyns in the Journal of South African Botany. The Red List of South African Plants has listed it as endangered since 2007 due to habitat loss caused by nearby urban expansion, crop cultivation, and sand mining, as well as invasive species. Its population is decreasing.

Description
It branches mainly from its base. Its leaves are stalkless and mostly bundled with a pointed tip. It flowers between September and January.

References

Polygalaceae